The Zoological Museum of Kiel University is a zoological museum in Kiel, Germany. It was founded by naturalist Karl Möbius, and architect Martin Gropius designed the building. The exhibitions display systematics, evolution, tropical and German fauna, butterfly ecology and history of zoology in Kiel. The museum is part of the University of Kiel.

History 
Collections include specimens of Johann Daniel Major, Johan Christian Fabricius and Christian Rudolph Wilhelm Wiedemann and from marine zoology expeditions: Galathea expedition, 1845–1847; the Albatross expedition, 1876–1885; the German Plankton-Expedition, 1889; the first German deep-sea expedition, 1898–1899; and the first German southpolar expedition. 1901–1903.

External links
Official Site 

Museums in Schleswig-Holstein
University museums in Germany
Kiel
University of Kiel